Jackie Robinson is a 2016 American television documentary miniseries directed by Ken Burns. It debuted as a two-part series, the first half premiering on April 11, 2016, and the second half airing the following night. It concerns the life of Jackie Robinson, the first African-American to play in the major leagues of baseball in the modern era.

Actors and historians
The documentary series is narrated by Keith David, and features the voice of Jamie Foxx as Jackie Robinson. A large group of noted commentators give background information. They include:
Harry Belafonte 
Howard Bryant
Ed Charles
Gerald Early
Jonathan Eig
Carl Erskine
Barack Obama
Michelle Obama 
David Robinson (Jackie's son) 
Rachel Robinson (Jackie's widow) 
Sharon Robinson (Jackie's daughter)
John Thorn
George Will
Yohuru Williams

Episodes
 "Jackie Robinson: Part I"
 "Jackie Robinson: Part II"

References

External links
 

Cultural depictions of Jackie Robinson
2010s American documentary television series